Othonoi (also rendered as Othoni) is a small inhabited Greek island in the Ionian Sea, located northwest of Corfu, and is the westernmost point of Greece. Othonoi is the largest and most populated of the Diapontian Islands. Since the 2019 local government reform it is part of the municipality of Central Corfu and Diapontian Islands.

In the 19th century the island was the capital of the Diapontia Islands municipality, which also included nearby islands of Ereikoussa, Mathraki, islets and rocks of Diakopo, Diaplo, Karavi, Kastrino, Leipso, Ostrako, Plaka, Plateia and Tracheia. Othonoi is about 47 nautical miles from Santa Maria di Leuca cape, Italy.

Name
The first name according to ancient texts (Hesychius, 3rd cent. BC) was "Othronos" (Ὀθρωνός), "Othronoi" (Ὀθρωνοί) and by Procopius seems to be "Othonē" (Ὀθωνή)  (6th c.). According to Pliny (1st cent.), it was "Thoronos" (Θόρονος). Other names were "Fidonisi" (Snake island) because of the many snakes that are said to have invaded the island, and "Fanò" (Lamp) which is used in international charters and by the Italians because of the lighthouse situated on the island. Othoni was called "Calypso island" in many maps of 16th century.  Another Greek name for the island is "Astakonisi" (Αστακονήσι); the Albanian name is Strakëna, which may be a cognate of it that ultimately derives from reconstructed Doric Greek Ostrakonásion. A second etymological approach for the latter, is that it derives from the plural of the Greek adjective ostrakinón (οστρακινόν), which is ostrakiná (οστρακινά); likely expressing a quality of the island.

Nowadays the Othonians living in Corfu sometimes call the island "Pera" ("Πέρα" meaning: beyond), as the island is located beyond Corfu.

History
At the beginning of the second millennium, the island was conquered alternatively by the Franks (the 11th century) and the Venetians (12th century), and often attacked by pirates of Barbary and Algeria. From the end of 1383 until 1386 the domination of Corfu was held by Charles III of Naples. In a letter from April 19, 1383, he granted the usufruct of Othonoi, Ereikoussa, Mathraki, Diapolo and Vido, to the knight Theodore Skaliti as fief.
In 1537, the Turkish fleet under the command of Hayreddin Barbarossa massacred the inhabitants of Othoni island after a long battle. In Stavros district at an altitude of 217 m. a white stone cross exists until today to commemorate that event.

The last settlers of Othonoi apparently came from Paxos and Ioannina, Parga and the region of Epirus. This occurred after the Battle of Nafpaktos in 1571 when the Turkish fleet was destroyed and the islanders began to move more safely. After the last movement, the residents of Othonoi island colonized the two other small islands, Ereikoussa and Mathraki.
In 1815, the British conquered Othonoi. With the Treaty signed on March 29, 1864, between the three powers (United Kingdom, France, Russia) and the Kingdom of Greece, the Ionian Islands including the Diapontian islands passed definitively to Greek sovereignty on 21 May. From 1869 until 1912 Othonoi, Ereikousa and Mathraki formed the municipality of Dimos Diapontion with Othonoi as capital.

Sinking of Submarine Protefs

On 29 December 1940, the Greek submarine Protefs sank in the sea area of Othonoi. The submarine had attacked an Italian convoy carrying ammunition to Vlorë. The loss of the submarine was the first loss of the Greek Navy in World War II. A monument to honor the memory of the crew was inaugurated in Othonoi on June 15, 2015.

Mythology 
According to legend, the ancient poet Homer referred to Othonoi in The Odyssey as Ogygia, island of the nymph Calypso, who lived in a large cave there. Odysseus fell in love with her, and remained there seven years as her prisoner.

Some evidence in favor of this legend appears in the same writings of Homer. He described a strong scent of cypress on Ogygia, and many cypress trees grow on Othonoi. Shortly after leaving the island on a raft, Odysseus is shipwrecked on the island of Scheria, known today as Corfu. This implies that the two mythical islands were separated by a relatively short distance, and indeed, the islands of Othonoi and Corfu are separated by a relatively short distance.

According to Hesychius, after the Trojan War, Elephenor, king of Avantes, fled from Euboea to the island after the fall of Troy, to atone as he had killed his grandfather, Abas.

Economy 
Most Othoniotes (local dialect: Thoniotes) have migrated to Corfu, Athens, and abroad (especially to the USA) because of the unemployment and few exploitable resources (1900-1960). The main work was olive and olive oil production. Most men of that time were involved in nautical professions (sailor, bosun, carpenter, captain, skipper, etc.) and worked on commercial and warships which were operating in every part of the earth. The main occupations of current residents are tourism, construction, fishing, and olive production. Previously, there has been significant cultivation of vines, beekeeping and livestock.

Settlements
Othonoi is divided into two regions which are Ano Panta and Kato Panta. There are more than 20 settlements.

Main sights

Churches
Holy Trinity church (1892) at Ammos.
Virgin Mary church  near Stavros district.
Saint George church() (about 1864) at Chorio.
Agia Paraskevi church (and the old stone mill) at Damaskatika.

Other buildings
School of Othonoi (1912) at Ammos.
Ruins of the Venetian fortress at the northeast end of Kastri cape hilltop at an altitude of 100 m.
Lighthouse of Othonoi (built in 1872).

Monuments
Cross monument at Stavros, for the massacre of the inhabitants of Othonoi by the Ottoman fleet under Hayreddin Barbarossa in 1537.
Monument to seafarers of Othonoi island, at Ammos.
Monument to submarine PROTEUS, at Ammos.

Nature
Aspri Ammos beach which is accessible only by boat to the west of the island. 
Cave of Calypso, near of Aspri ammos beach.
Mount Imerovigli and the highest peak of the island with height of 
Kamara near Ammos.
Iliovasilema (sunset) at Chorio.</ref>

Beaches 
Most beaches on the island are accessible by boat, including Ammos, Molos, Kamini, Kanoula, Kontoskes, Rogi, Fyki, Xilosermi, and Aspri Ammos. It is a well-known island for underwater photography because of the peculiar geomorphology of the seabed and the many caves. Other points of interest are the Moshopontikas,  Xylosermi, Fyki bay (where there is the sunken wreck of Sarah ship). Othonoi was frequently visited by the French naturalist Jacques Cousteau and his exploratory vessel Calypso.

Trails 

The traditional trail was created and used by the first inhabitants and was subsequently reopened by the municipality and private initiatives.

Others
Port of Ammos is the most populous district with small guesthouses, restaurants, rent-a-bike store, cafes, police station, a community clinic with ambulance and port authority.

Nature

Flora 
The island is almost completely covered by trees which produce a small species of olive, the "Elea the cherry" (Olea microcarpa), commonly Lianolia or ladoelia, with a high content of high-quality oil, which is common in all the Ionian Islands.
There are cypresses and fruit trees on almost all mountain slopes. The tall mulberry (or Skamnia) and fig (or Skeria) are found in nearly all districts and gardens that host many species of fruit and vegetables, and features large cabbage called by Othoniotes cramps, as in Cyprus. Most houses have, instead of tents or sheds, pergolas with vines or pergoulies. Oregano, sage and many other herbs.

Fauna 

Othonoi is the first migratory bird station in southeastern Europe from Libya, especially for turtle doves. There are also grouse and snipe (xilokotes) during the winter months, and Petritis falcons, the European bee-eater birds, martins, ravens and several species of eagles.
There are several hares and rabbits. The most common species of reptile is the viper (Vipera ammodytes or astritis).
Marine mammals have been observed off the island's coast, including the bottlenose dolphin, at least three species of sharks (including white shark), while sporadically near the cave of Calypso there have been monk seals. Also found are almost all varieties of marine fauna, such as the white sea bream, red mullet, the snapper, the grouper, the bumpkin (weighing up to 30 pounds), octopus, moray, the stingray, lobster. Remarkable is the presence of barnacles and sea urchins.
Zooplankton is in small coves of the island and especially in seaweed is abundant at night, and when the sea is calm, the plankton illuminates the sea bed.

Climate 
The climate of Othonoi is mild and generally warm and temperate. The winters are rainier than the summers. The Köppen-Geiger climate classification is Csa. The average temperature in Othonoi is 16.7 °C. About 1026 mm of precipitation falls annually.

Dialect 
A dialect is spoken resembling that of Corfu and having similar prosody. It is heavily influenced by Italian.

Transport 
The island is accessible by boat with regular services from Corfu port and Agios Stefanos Avliotes. There is a port in Avlakia district (with fishing port), for several small private yachts and boats.The island has a heliport for emergencies. There is complete electrification and a telephone network with Internet access.

Othonoi in Literature
Ionion akron. Greece in the narrow of Otranto 
Folklore mission to Diapontia islands, by Dimitrios Loukatos, 2012
Ereikoussa, the extra garden and the continental shelf of Diapontia islands by greek journalist, Georgios Lekakis, 2014
The Fiddler's daughter by Dimitra Kapelouzou, 2004

Gallery

References

 
Landforms of Corfu (regional unit)